Yilong is a county in the northeast of Sichuan Province, China. It is under the administration of the prefecture-level city of Nanchong. Zhu De's Former Residence is located here. Zhu De was general and one of the pioneers of the Chinese Communist Party.

Traffic

Tabfba road:Across Jingcheng and Tumen()
Yibei road:Across Jincheng and Sanjiao
Xinma road:Across Xinzhen and Ma'an
Bazhong–Nanchong Expressway

Geography
Yilong is Located in northeastern Sichuan and the transition zone of Yilong low mountains and hilly, mainly of it is hilly. It has many rivers such as the Jialing River, a major Yangtze tributary.

Administrative Districts
This county has 29 towns and 27 townships, 879 village committees, 6040 Groups of villagers, 56 Residents committees and 56 Residents groups. July 8, 2003 by the State Council, the People's Government of the resident Yilong County town of Jincheng moved to the town of Xinzheng, September 29, 2005 officially moved to the town of Xinzheng.

Views and source

 China Petroleum's gas field of large gas in the eastern Sichuan Longgang, most of which is located Yilong.
 Zhu De's Former Residence

figure
Zhu De
Zhuang Side

Climate

References

 
County-level divisions of Sichuan
Nanchong